The 1967 Polish Speedway season was the 1967 season of motorcycle speedway in Poland.

Individual

Polish Individual Speedway Championship
The 1967 Individual Speedway Polish Championship final was held on 1 October at Rybnik.

Golden Helmet
The 1967 Golden Golden Helmet organised by the Polish Motor Union (PZM) was the 1967 event for the league's leading riders.

Calendar

Final classification

Junior Championship
 winner - Zbigniew Jąder

Silver Helmet
 winner - Edward Jancarz

Team

Team Speedway Polish Championship
The 1967 Team Speedway Polish Championship was the 20th edition of the Team Polish Championship. 

KS ROW Rybnik won the gold medal for the sixth consecutive season.
 The team included Joachim Maj, Antoni Woryna, Andrzej Wyglenda and Stanisław Tkocz.

First League

Second League

References

Poland Individual
Poland Team
Speedway
1967 in Polish speedway